Wayne UNC Health Care is a nonprofit hospital affiliate of UNC Health Care, a health care system in North Carolina. Its name changed from Wayne Memorial Hospital when it entered into a management agreement with UNC Health Care in 2015.

References

External links 
 Official site

Hospitals in North Carolina
Hospitals established in 1896
Buildings and structures in Wayne County, North Carolina